Abacetus sudanicus is a species of ground beetle in the subfamily Pterostichinae. It was described by Straneo in 1984.

References

sudanicus
Beetles described in 1984